Macready is a surname. Notable people with the surname include:

Agnes Macready (1855–1935), Australian nurse and journalist
Carol MacReady, English actress
Edward Nevil Macready, (1798–1848), British Army officer
George Macready (1899–1973), American screen actor
Gordon Macready (1891–1956), British Army officer
Nevil Macready (1862–1946), British Army officer
John Macready (gymnast) (born 1975), American gymnast and motivational speaker
John A. Macready (1887–1979), American aviator
William Macready (1793–1873), English actor
William Macready the elder (1755–1829), Irish actor-manager
Paul MacCready (1925–2007), American aeronautical engineer

Fictional characters 

 MacCready, supporting character voiced by Matthew Mercer in the video game Fallout 4
 R.J MacReady, protagonist of The Thing
 McReady, protagonist of Who Goes There ? (same character)

See also
 Macready baronets
 The Thing (1982 film), protagonist R.J. MacReady